Domvile is a surname. Notable people with the surname include:

Barry Domvile (1878–1971), British naval officer
Compton Domvile (disambiguation), multiple people
Domvile Baronets (disambiguation)

See also
Domville (disambiguation)